Suffield Point is the south-west entrance point of Norma Cove, Fildes Peninsula, on King George Island in the South Shetland Islands of Antarctica. It was charted in the course of the Discovery Investigations, 1933–35, and named after boatswain William E. Suffield. The site is part of the Fildes Peninsula Antarctic Specially Protected Area (ASPA 125), designated as such because of its paleontological values.

See also
 List of lighthouses in Antarctica

References

Headlands of King George Island (South Shetland Islands)
Antarctic Specially Protected Areas
Lighthouses in Antarctica